Devosa (minor planet designation: 337 Devosa) is a large Main belt asteroid. It was discovered by Auguste Charlois on 22 September 1892 in Nice. These orbital elements are similar to that of the large asteroid 4 Vesta. The orbital plane of 337 Devosa is tilted at an angle of 7.85° to the plane of the ecliptic.

This is classified as an X-type asteroid in the Tholen system and Xk type in the Bus-DeMeo taxonomy, with spectral properties similar to mesosiderites.

References

External links 
 
 

000337
Discoveries by Auguste Charlois
Named minor planets
000337
000337
18920922